In the last few years, the agent-based modeling (ABM) community has developed several practical agent based modeling toolkits that enable individuals to develop agent-based applications. More and more such toolkits are coming into existence, and each toolkit has a variety of characteristics. Several individuals have made attempts to compare toolkits to each other (see references). Below is a chart intended to capture many of the features that are important to ABM toolkit users.

Comparison of ABM Software

References

External links 
 Survey of Agent Based Modelling and Simulation Tools

Software comparisons